Francis Bailey and similar may refer to:

Francis Baylie, 17th-century English shipbuilder, also called Francis Bailey
Francis Baylies (1783–1852), American politician
Frances Bailey (born 1946), Australian politician
Francis Bailey (publisher) (1744–1817), American publisher
F. Lee Bailey (Francis Lee Bailey Jr., 1933–2021), American attorney
Frank Bailey (disambiguation)
Francis Baily (1774–1844), English astronomer
Francis Gibson Baily, British electrical engineer